Fetish Girl may refer to:

 A pornographic novel written by John Glassco under the pseudonym Sylvia Bayer
 A painting  by Cathy Lomax